Valentine Walter Bromley (14 February 1848 – 30 April 1877) was a British artist. He was born into a well-known family of artists: his grandfather, William Bromley the Younger (1769-1842), was a tint-engraver and an Associate of the Royal Academy; his great-grandfather, William Bromley the Elder, also an engraver.

Valentine Bromley received his art education from his father, William Bromley (III), a member of the Institute of British Artists. At the age of nineteen, he became an Associate of the Institute of Painters in Water-Colours.

A frequent art correspondent for The Illustrated London News, Bromley also worked as a book-illustrator; among other works, he illustrated Lord Dunraven's 'Great Divide'.

Bromley died unexpectedly at the age of twenty-nine at Fallows Green, Harpenden, after undertaking an important series of illustrations of the Bible and the works of Shakespeare.

Notable Artwork

References
 

1848 births
1877 deaths
19th-century British painters
British male painters
19th-century British male artists